The fourth season of HGTV Design Star premiered on July 19, 2009. The series was filmed in Los Angeles, California for the first time. Vern Yip returned as a judge, and was joined by newcomers Genevieve Gorder and Candice Olson. Clive Pearse returned as host, and this was his final season hosting the show. A major change this season was that the judges decided the winner, instead of having a public vote. The winner was Antonio Ballatore, whose show The Antonio Treatment debuted in March 2010.

Designers

Guest Designers:

1 Age at the time of the show's filming
2 Dan Vickery did audition for Design Star Season 3 but was not picked to compete

Contestant progress

 (WINNER) The designer won the competition.
 (RUNNER-UP) The designer received second place.
 (WIN) The designer was selected as the winner of the episode's Elimination Challenge.
 (HIGH) The designer was selected as one of the top entries in the Elimination Challenge, but did not win.
 (IN) The designer was not selected as either top entry or bottom entry in the Elimination Challenge, and advanced to the next challenge.
 (LOW) The designer was selected as one of the bottom entries in the Elimination Challenge, but was not deemed the worst of the designers who advanced in that particular week.
 (LOW) The designer was selected as one of the bottom two entries in the Elimination Challenge, and was deemed the worst of the designers who advanced in that particular week.
 (OUT) The designer was eliminated from the competition.
 (OUT) The designer was eliminated from the competition before the judges deliberated.

1 In a Design Star first, Tashica was eliminated before the judges' deliberation. This was due to her underwhelming performance in the competition, constant excuses, and lack of ability to have her design ideas expressed in a team situation. It reached the ultimatum in the fourth episode, and Vern Yip questioned why he and the other two judges kept bringing her back week after week. While she continued giving more excuses, he and the judges quickly decided to eliminate her. As the elimination in the episode was a double elimination, this change did not affect anything else, and Jany was eliminated normally.
The first season the winner never was in bottom 3 or 2

2009 American television seasons